Chryseomicrobium excrementi is a Gram-positive, rod-shaped, slightly halotolerant and nitrate-reducing bacterium from the genus of Chryseomicrobium which has been isolated from the cast of an earthworm (Eisenia fetida) from the University of North Bengal at Siliguri in India.

References

Bacillales
Bacteria described in 2018